Thouars may refer to:
 Thouars, a town in France
 List of viscounts of Thouars
 Dupetit Thouars (disambiguation)